Glyptocombus is a genus of jumping soil bugs in the family Schizopteridae.

Glyptocombus was formerly considered a monotypic genus, but in 2018 Weirauch, et al., described three new species from the United States and Mexico.

Species
These four species belong to the genus Glyptocombus;

 Glyptocombus halberti Weirauch 2018
 Glyptocombus mexicanus Weirauch 2018
 Glyptocombus saltator Heidemann, 1906
 Glyptocombus suteri Weirauch 2018

References

Further reading

 

Schizopteridae
Heteroptera genera
Articles created by Qbugbot